List of Choctaw Treaties is a comprehensive chronological list of historic agreements that directly or indirectly affected the Choctaw people, a Native American tribe, with other nations. Choctaw land was systematically obtained through treaties, legislation, and threats of warfare. Treaties were made with Great Britain, France, and Spain. Nine treaties were signed with the United States. Some treaties, like the Treaty of San Lorenzo, indirectly affected the Choctaws.

The Choctaws considered European laws and diplomacy foreign and puzzling. The most confusing aspect of treaty making was writing which was impressive for a people who had not developed a written system. Choctaw history, as with many Native Americans, was passed orally from generation to generation. European cultural conventions require written treaties to prevent disputes about the contents of the agreement and to enable wider dissemination through copying. During treaty negotiations the three main Choctaw tribal areas (Upper Towns, Six town, and Lower Towns) had a "Miko" (chief) to represent them. Spain had the earliest claims to Choctaw country which was followed by French claims starting in the late 17th century. The United States, following the Treaty of San Lorenzo, laid claim to Choctaw country starting in 1795.

By the early 19th century pressure from U.S. southern states, like Georgia, encouraged the procurement of Native American lands. The Treaty of Fort Adams was the first in a series of treaties that ceded Choctaw lands. The Choctaws were relocated from their homeland, now known as the Deep South, to lands west of the Mississippi River. Approximately 15,000 Choctaws made the move to what would be called Indian Territory and then later Oklahoma. About 2,500 died along the trail of tears. The Treaty of Dancing Rabbit Creek required the Choctaws to sign away the remaining traditional homeland to the United States. There would be three waves of removals starting in 1831. After the final wave of removal in 1833, nearly 6,000 Choctaws chose to stay in the newly formed state of Mississippi. Despite the grant of citizenship and land to Choctaws that chose to stay, the newly settled European-Americans persistently urged the Mississippi Choctaws to remove, but they refused. Although smaller Choctaw groups can be found throughout the U.S. south, Choctaws are mainly found in Florida, Oklahoma and Mississippi.

Treaties

Indian Appropriations Act of 1871

In 1871 Congress added a rider to the Indian Appropriations Act to end the United States' recognizing additional Indian tribes or nations, and prohibiting additional treaties.

See also
 Choctaw Trail of Tears
 Treaty of Hopewell
 Treaty of Washington City
 Treaty of Doak's Stand
 Treaty of Dancing Rabbit Creek
 Yowani Choctaws
 List of treaties

References

Choctaw
Choctaw